Robert Berkeley Davis (born 1 October 1947) is an English guitarist and songwriter.

Early career
Davis received his first guitar when he was 11 years old and music became a central part of his life. In 1962, at the age of 15, he and Dave Mounts formed a band called The Apaches, with a Shadows sound.  He and Mounts continued to work together in several bands, including the Barracudas and in 1964, formed the Remainder.  He joined the Mourners who were looking for a lead guitarist and in 1966, changed their name to Mud.

Mud
 Davis was a founding member of the successful late 1960s and 1970s glam rock band Mud.  In addition to playing lead guitar, he wrote a number of the band’s songs.  He wrote the band’s first single, “Flower Power” which was released in the October 1967 but did not garner much success.  While he did not compose any of the songs on the band’s first two full albums, he wrote or co-wrote over 45 songs for the band and their subsequent albums. His first and biggest songwriting hit with Mud was "L'L'Lucy" which reached number 10 on the UK Singles Chart in September 1975. It became a bigger hit in both Belgium and the Netherlands, where it reached No. 1 for twelve and nine weeks, respectively.  Davis wrote the B-sides on two of Mud's biggest hits, "Tiger Feet" and "Dyna-Mite".  The band broke up in 1977.

Other groups
Davis worked with several other groups, including the Tremeloes and Darts, but his efforts met with little commercial success.

Songwriting
Although Davis wrote many of Mud's songs, he achieved songwriting success after the band disbanded.  Following a chance meeting with Paul Oakenfold, in the late 1980s, he shifted genres from rock to writing club and dance lyrics.  He would receive instrumental tracks from producers and incorporate lyrics.  He started working with Coco Star, writing “I Need a Miracle” which was released in 1996 and re-recorded version released in 1997 peaked at #39 in the UK.

In 2000, he achieved his biggest commercial songwriting successes.  Fragma's "Toca's Miracle" became Davis’ first #1 hit and was a mashup of Davis-written “I Need a Miracle” by Coco and Fragma's instrumental “Toca Me”. The song was released on 10 April and won critical acclaim, peaking at #1 in both the UK and Scotland.  There have been multiple re-releases that have achieved chart success.  On 14 August Spiller released "Groovejet (If This Ain't Love)", on which he provided important lyrical support.  The song reached #1 in five countries including the UK, Australia and New Zealand.  It finished #8 on the UK 2000 year-end charts.

In their first songwriting session together, Davis and Cathy Dennis wrote "Can't Get You Out of My Head" for Kylie Minogue.  Released in 2001, it was the first song to have 3,000 radio plays in a single week in the UK, reached #1 in all but one European country and sold over four million copies.  Davis and Dennis received an Ivor Novello Award for composing the most performed song of the year. The song was originally intended for Sophie Ellis-Bextor, but she turned it down according to Davis, although Sophie later claimed that the proposal never got to her in the first place. Davis soon met Minogue's A&R manager Jamie Nelson who liked it and wanted her to record it.  While Minogue was not the original artist selected, Dennis believes Minogue was the best artist for the song.  The two writers also teamed up to write Brooke Hogan's single, "Everything to Me", in 2004.  The song reached #1 on the Billboard Singles Sales chart.

In the Grammy Awards of 2004, Davis shared a Grammy with co-producer Philip Larsen (Manhattan Clique) and performer Minogue, for another Minogue single "Come into My World", in the category of Best Dance Recording.  The song reached No. 4 in Australia while peaking at No. 8 in the UK.

Davis also worked with Jan Johnston and together they wrote six songs including "Am I on Pause?".  His latest commercial works include co-writing for the song "One Foot Boy" from Mika's album, The Boy Who Knew Too Much (2009).

Television appearances
In December 2005, Davis appeared in the Channel 4 programme, Bring Back...The Christmas Number One. In January 2008, Davis appeared in the BBC Four television documentary, Pop, What Is It Good For?. In December 2009, he appeared in the Channel 4 programme The Greatest Songs of the Noughties, which featured "Can't Get You Out of My Head", ranked at No. 9 (in a Top 20). In December 2018, Davis appeared on BBC One's Pointless Celebrities Christmas Special. In October 2021, he contributed to the Channel 5 series Britain's Biggest 70s Hits appearing on the 1970 episode alongside Ray Dorset and David Hamilton.

References

1947 births
Living people
English rock guitarists
English pop guitarists
English male guitarists
English songwriters
Musicians from Surrey
People from Carshalton
Grammy Award winners
Glam rock musicians
British male songwriters